The Robertson Draw Fire is a large wildfire that started near Red Lodge, Montana on June 13, 2021. It has so far burned  and was completely contained by mid-September.

Events

June 
The Robertson Draw Fire was first reported on June 13, 2021 at around 2:15 pm MDT near Asotin, Washington.

Cause 
The cause of the fire is believed to be human caused.

Containment 
As of August 8, 2021, the fire was 90% percent contained and was completely contained by mid-September the same year.

Impact

Closures and Evacuations 

Since the fire Impacted Red Lodge the town had to evacuate.

See also 

 2021 Montana wildfires
 List of Montana wildfires

References 

2021 Montana wildfires
July 2021 events in the United States
Wildfires in Montana